Salangen Church is a parish church of the Church of Norway in Salangen Municipality in Troms og Finnmark county, Norway. It is located in the village of Sjøvegan. It is one of the churches for the Salangen parish which is part of the Senja prosti (deanery) in the Diocese of Nord-Hålogaland. The white concrete church with wood accents was built in a long church style in 1981 using plans drawn up by the architect Harald Hille. The church seats about 420 people.

History
The first church built in Salangen was constructed in 1864 on the same site as the present church. The church burned down on 21 September 1978 in an apparent case of arson (since the nearby Lavangen Church caught fire on the same day). After the fire, there was some local controversy on where to build the church on the south side of the road, next to the cemetery. It was decided to rebuild it on the same site. The new church was completed in 1981 and consecrated on 13 December 1981. The new church contains the main nave, but also a parish hall, kitchen, bathrooms, offices, and other smaller meeting rooms.

See also
List of churches in Nord-Hålogaland

References

Salangen
Churches in Troms
20th-century Church of Norway church buildings
Churches completed in 1981
1864 establishments in Norway
Long churches in Norway
Concrete churches in Norway